Thetatorquevirus is a genus in the family of Anelloviridae, in group II in the Baltimore classification. The genus contains 10 species.

Taxonomy
The genus contains the following species:

Torque teno arthrovec virus 3
Torque teno canid virus 1
Torque teno mustilid virus 1
Torque teno procyo virus 5
Torque teno procyo virus 6
Torque teno ursid virus 1
Torque teno ursid virus 2
Torque teno ursid virus 3
Torque teno ursid virus 4
Torque teno viverrid virus 4

References

External links 
ICTV Virus Taxonomy 2009 
UniProt Taxonomy 
 
 ICTVdb
 ViralZone: Thetatorquevirus

Anelloviridae
Virus genera